The 40th Virginia Cavalry Battalion was a cavalry battalion which served in the Confederate States Army during the American Civil War. It was organized in July 1863 with six companies and served in the Department of Richmond. In September it was merged with 32nd Virginia Cavalry Battalion to form the 42nd Virginia Cavalry Battalion.

See also
List of Virginia Civil War units

Sources
 40th Virginia Cavalry Battalion page

Units and formations of the Confederate States Army from Virginia
1863 establishments in Virginia
Military units and formations established in 1863
1865 disestablishments in Virginia
Military units and formations disestablished in 1865